The Brauron Archaeological Museum is a museum in Markopoulo Mesogeias, Greece. Much of the collection is derived from excavations in the Sanctuary of Artemis at Brauron. Of note is a statue representing a small girl, a so-called "bear" (arktoi) (Medvedicka).

External links

Hellenic Ministry of Culture and Tourism
www.planetware.com

Brauron